Heinrich Wilhelm Schott (7 January 1794 in  Brünn (Brno), Moravia – 5 March  1865 at Schönbrunn Palace, Vienna) was an Austrian botanist well known for his extensive work on aroids (Araceae). 

He studied botany, agriculture and chemistry at the University of Vienna, where he was a pupil of Joseph Franz von Jacquin (1766–1839). He was a participant in the Austrian Brazil Expedition from 1817 to 1821. In 1828 he was appointed Hofgärtner (royal gardener) in Vienna, later serving as director of the Imperial Gardens at Schönbrunn Palace (1845). In 1852 he was in charge of transforming part of palace gardens in the fashion of an English garden. He also enriched the Viennese court gardens with his collections from Brazil. He was also interested in Alpine flora, and was responsible for development of the alpinum at Schloss Belvedere in Vienna.

In 2008, botanists P.C.Boyce & S.Y.Wong published Schottarum, a genus of flowering plants from Borneo belonging to the family Araceae. Then they published Schottariella, a monotypic genus of flowering plants from Borneo belonging to the family Araceae, both genera were named in honour of Heinrich Wilhelm Schott.

Publications 
 Meletemata botanica (with Stephan Ladislaus Endlicher), 1832
 Rutaceae. Fragmenta botanica, 1834
 Genera filicum, 1834–1836
 Aroideae, 1853–1857
 Analecta botanica (with Theodor Kotschy and Carl Fredrik Nyman), 1854
 Synopsis Aroidearum, 1856
 Icones Aroidearum, 1857
 Genera Aroidearum Exposita, 1858
 Prodromus Systematis Aroidearum, 1860

External links 
 The Botanical Art of Schott's Aroideae Maximilianae by Scott Hyndman
 Deutsche Biographie Schott, Heinrich Wilhelm (biography).

References 

 Biography
 Riedl, H.; Riedl-Dorn, Christa - Heinrich Wilhelm Schott's botanical collections at the Vienna Natural History Museum; International Association for Plant Taxonomy - Utrecht (1988) ISBN/ISSN 0040-0262

1794 births
1865 deaths
Scientists from Brno
People from the Margraviate of Moravia
Austrian people of Moravian-German descent
19th-century Austrian botanists
Botanists with author abbreviations
Pteridologists